Marine Attack Squadron 143 (VMA-143), nicknamed the Rocket Raiders, was a reserve attack squadron in the United States Marine Corps.  Originally commissioned during World War II, the squadron fought at the Guadalcanal, New Georgia, the Battle of Bougainville, Battle of Okinawa, and the Battle of Balikpapan.

History
Marine Scout Bombing Squadron 143 (VMSB-143) was commissioned on September 7, 1942 at Naval Air Station San Diego, California.  The squadron departed San Diego on December 28, 1942 arriving at Efate on January 16, 1943.  The squadron's flight echelon arrived at Guadalcanal on February 15, 1943.  During this time they took part in mine laying operations of Kahili Harbor on Bougainville on March 21, 1943 and supported ground troops during the New Georgia campaign.

On May 19, 1943 planes from VMSB-143 and the Navy's Torpedo Squadron 11 (VT-11) strafed and bombed the Japanese cargo ship Hōun Maru causing it to run aground in Buin Harbor. The squadron was re-designated as Marine Torpedo Bombing Squadron 143 (VMTB-143) on May 31, 1943.  On October 1, 1943 the flight echelon of the squadron was divided into three parts in order to support the Bougainville Campaign.  These echelons were based at Guadalcanal, Espiritu Santo, and Munda Airfield.  In January 1944 the squadron moved to Bougainville and from there participated in airstrikes against the Japanese garrison at Rabaul.

Returning to the United States in June 1944, the squadron was based at Marine Corps Air Station Santa Barbara.  The squadron was re-designated again as VMTB (CVS)-143 and was assigned to USS Gilbert Islands (CVE-107).  The squadron departed MCAS Santa Barbara on April 12, 1945.  During this final phase of the war, the squadron provided close air support during the Battle of Okinawa from May to July 1945.  After that is also supported the Australian 7th Division during the Battle of Balikpapan in Borneo. Following the war the squadron returned to Marine Corps Air Station El Toro, California and was deactivated on March 10, 1946 as part of the post war drawdown of forces.

In August 1945, famed comic strip artist Alex Raymond was made an honorary member of the unit while serving alongside them in the Pacific War. He designed a new squadron patch inspired by his work creating Flash Gordon, leading to the squadron nickname of "The Rocket Raiders".

See also
 United States Marine Corps Aviation
 List of decommissioned United States Marine Corps aircraft squadrons

Citations

References

143
Inactive units of the United States Marine Corps